Nadir Colledani (born 10 April 1995) is an Italian cyclo-cross and cross-country mountain biker. He finished 8th at the 2020 UCI Cross-country World Championships.

Major results

Cyclo-cross

2011–2012
 3rd National Junior Championships
 3rd Gran Premio Mamma E Papa Guerciotti Juniors
2012–2013
 2nd Gran Premio Mamma E Papa Guerciotti Juniors
 2nd Ciclocross del Ponte Juniors
 3rd National Junior Championships
2014–2015
 1st  National Under-23 Championships
 Giro d'Italia Cross
3rd Padova
3rd Isola d'Elba
2015–2016
 1st  National Under-23 Championships
 Giro d'Italia Cross
2nd Roma
2nd Fiuggi
2nd Montalto di Castro
2016–2017
 3rd National Under-23 Championships
 3rd Igorre
 3rd Trofeo San Andres
2018–2019
 2nd Trofeo di Gorizia
2021–2022
 1st Gran Premio Internazionale di Jesolo

MTB
2015
 2nd National Under-23 XCO Championships
2016
 2nd National Under-23 XCO Championships
2017
 2nd  European Under-23 XCO Championships
 2nd National Under-23 XCO Championships
 2nd  European Team Relay Championships
2020
 8th UCI World XCO Championships
2021
 1st  National XCO Championships

References

External links

1995 births
Living people
Cyclo-cross cyclists
Italian male cyclists
Italian mountain bikers
Cyclists at the 2020 Summer Olympics
Olympic cyclists of Italy
Cyclists from Friuli Venezia Giulia